Blenheim Palace has frequently been the setting for books, TV programs and films and other events. These include:

As a filming location 
A 2021 survey by House of Oak concluded that Blenheim Palace had made 71 appearances in film and television, more than any other English country house; the site offers a tour of the various filming locations there. Films shot at the exteriors include Spectre while the interior has been used as a filming location for Mission: Impossible – Rogue Nation among others.

Blenheim on film and TV 

The BFG (2016) 
King Ralph (1991)

Architectural historian Dan Cruickshank selected the Palace as one of his four choices for the 2002 BBC television documentary series Britain's Best Buildings.

Blenheim in art 
The British painter John Piper (1903–1992) was commissioned to paint scenes in the grounds of the palace during the 1980s. In 2012, an exhibition of the artist's work entitled John Piper at Blenheim Palace was held in a room at the palace to commemorate the 20th anniversary of Piper's death.

References 

Mass media lists
Culture in Oxfordshire
Woodstock, Oxfordshire
United Kingdom in popular culture